Koduri Viswa Vijayendra Prasad (born 1 February 1943) is an Indian screenwriter and film director who predominantly works in Telugu cinema. He also worked in a few Hindi, Kannada, and Tamil films. His filmography consists of more than twenty five films as a screenwriter, most of which were commercially successful.

His notable work as a screenwriter includes films like the Baahubali series, RRR (2022), Bajrangi Bhaijaan (2015), Manikarnika (2019), Magadheera (2009), and Mersal (2017). In 2011, he directed the Telugu film Rajanna, which won the Nandi Award for Best Feature Film. In 2016, he won the Filmfare Award for Best Story for the film Bajrangi Bhaijaan. His upcoming films include 1770, Sita: The Incarnation, Aparaajitha Ayodhya, Pawan Putra Bhaijaan, and Vikramarkudu 2.

On 6 July 2022, President of India Ram Nath Kovind nominated him as a member of Rajya Sabha, the upper house of Indian Parliament.

Early life
He was born as Koduri Viswa Vijayendra Prasad. He hails from Kovvur near Rajahmundry in Andhra Pradesh. He studied at Sir C.R. Reddy College in Eluru. His elder brother is Siva Shakthi Datta, a lyricist, screenwriter, and a painter.

Prasad's family had lands in Kovvur which were lost when the railways lines went  most through them. Then, Prasad moved to Karnataka from Kovvur in 1968. He, along with his elder brother K. V. Sivashankar, bought seven acres of paddy fields in Hirekotikal village of Manvi Taluk in Raichur district. Their family moved back to Kovvur in 1977. He also ventured into various businesses which ended up as losses.

Career 
His brother Siva Shakthi Datta's passion for films made Vijayendra Prasad and his family to shift to Madras. Datta assisted a couple of directors for some time and started a film titled Pillanagrovi which was stopped midway due to financial reasons. As his brother was already in the film industry, Prasad started assisting his brother.

Prasad got introduced to K. Raghavendra Rao through Samatha Arts’ Mukherjee who was a friend of his. Raghavendra Rao started giving him and Datta small assignments. They got their first break with Janaki Ramudu (1988) which became successful at the box office.

Next, he wrote the film Bangaru Kutumbam (1994) which won the Nandi Award for Best Film. His next film was Bobbili Simham (1994) which was commercially successful and earned Prasad recognition as a screenwriter. He later provided the story for Samarasimha Reddy (1999) which became one of the biggest hits of the time in Telugu cinema.

Personal life 
Prasad has two children—a daughter and a son. His son S. S. Rajamouli is a filmmaker. Prasad is uncle to music composers M. M. Keeravani, M. M. Srilekha, and Kalyani Malik. He dropped ‘K’ from his name, K. V. Vijayendra Prasad as he felt it was an indicator of his caste.

Prasad cited the screenwriting duo Salim–Javed (Salim Khan and Javed Akhtar) as a major inspiration on his work, especially their screenplay for Sholay (1975), among other films.

On July 6, 2022, BJP led Indian government nominated Prasad to the Rajya Sabha.

Awards

Nandi Awards
Nandi Award for Best Feature Film – Rajanna

Filmfare Awards 2016
Best Story – Bajrangi Bhaijaan

Sony Guild Awards 2016
Best Story – Bajrangi Bhaijaan

The Iconic Trade Achiever of the Year
The Iconic Trade Achiever of the Year – 2015 Award from Indywood Film Market

Filmography

Films
Director

Writer
Janaki Ramudu (1988)
Bangaru Kutumbam (1994)
Bobbili Simham (1994) 
Gharana Bullodu (1995)
Aalu Magalu (1995)
Sarada Bullodu (1996)
Appaji (1996) (Kannada)
Kurubana Rani (1998) (Kannada)
Rana (1998)
Samarasimha Reddy (1999)
Simhadri (2003)
Sye (2004)
Vijayendra Varma (2004)
Naa Alludu (2005)
Chatrapati (2005)
Pandu Ranga Vittala (2006) (Kannada)
Vikramarkudu (2006)
Yamadonga (2007)
Mitrudu (2009) 
Magadheera (2009)
Siruthai (2011)
Rowdy Rathore (2012)
Baahubali: The Beginning  (2015)
Bajrangi Bhaijaan (2015) (Hindi)
Jaguar (2016) (Kannada & Telugu)
Baahubali 2: The Conclusion (2017)
Mersal (2017) (Tamil) (co-written screenplay)
Manikarnika: The Queen of Jhansi (2019) (Hindi)
Thalaivi (2021) (Tamil and Hindi)
RRR (2022)
Sita: The Incarnation (TBA) (Hindi)
Aparaajitha Ayodhya (TBA) 
Pawan Putra Bhaijaan (TBA) (Hindi)

Television
Aarambh (Star Plus)

References

External links

 Where is1770?

Telugu screenwriters
Telugu film directors
Filmfare Awards winners
Living people
People from West Godavari district
Film directors from Andhra Pradesh
Indian male screenwriters
20th-century Indian film directors
21st-century Indian film directors
20th-century Indian dramatists and playwrights
21st-century Indian dramatists and playwrights
Screenwriters from Andhra Pradesh
20th-century Indian male writers
1942 births
21st-century Indian male writers
Nandi Award winners
Nominated members of the Rajya Sabha